The 39th Annual Daytime Emmy Awards presented by the National Academy of Television Arts and Sciences (NATAS), "recognizes outstanding achievement in all fields of daytime television production and are presented to individuals and programs broadcast from 2:00 a.m.—6:00 p.m. during the 2011 calendar year". The ceremony took place on June 23, 2012 at the Beverly Hilton Hotel,  in Beverly Hills, California beginning at 5:00 p.m. PST / 8:00 p.m. EST. The ceremony was televised in the United States by  HLN and produced by LocoDistro and Executive Producer Gabriel Gornell.

The evening was not hosted however the pre-show ceremony was hosted by A.J. Hammer and Nischelle Turner. The drama pre-nominees were announced on March 2, 2012, and the nominations were announced during an episode of The Today Show on May 9, 2012. In related events,  the 39th Annual Creative Arts Emmy Awards ceremony was held at the Westin Bonaventure in Los Angeles on June 17, 2012.

General Hospital won the most awards, with a total of five wins including Outstanding Drama Series and Outstanding Drama Series Directing Team and other Creative Arts Emmy Awards. The soap opera also had  the most awards with a total of 23 (including Creative Arts Emmy Awards). Anthony Geary won its seventh win in the Outstanding Lead Actor in a Drama Series category. Live! with Regis and Kelly won in the Outstanding Talk Show Entertainment category for its last season. The Lifetime Achievement Award was presented to television producer Bill Geddie. The ceremony attracted 912,000 viewers (not counting four repeat broadcasts which brought the total to 2 million), the broadcast was "the most watched regularly scheduled, non-news telecast" ever on HLN, but by far the least-watched Daytime Emmy ceremony ever.

Winners and nominees

In the lists below, the winner of the category is shown first, followed by the other nominees.

{| class="wikitable sortable"
|-
!scope="col"  style="width:20%;"|Category
!scope="col" style="width:27%;"| Winners and nominees
|-
!scope="row" style="width=50%"|Outstanding Drama Series
|
 General Hospital
 All My Children
 Days of Our Lives
 The Young and the Restless
|-
!scope="row" style="width=50%"|Outstanding Children's Animated Program
|
 The Penguins of Madagascar
 Dora the Explorer
 SpongeBob SquarePants
 Curious George
 Sid the Science Kid
 Peep and the Big Wide World
|-
!scope="row" style="width=50%"|Outstanding Game/Audience Participation Show
|
 Jeopardy!
 BrainSurge
 Cash Cab
 Let's Make a Deal
 Wheel of Fortune
 Who Wants to Be a Millionaire
|-
!scope="row" style="width=50%"|Outstanding Legal/Courtroom Program
|
 Last Shot with Judge Gunn
 America's Court with Judge Ross
 Judge Joe Brown
 We the People With Gloria Allred
|-
!scope="row" style="width=50%"|Outstanding Morning Program
|
 The Today Show
 Good Morning America
|-
!scope="row" style="width=50%"|Outstanding New Approaches – Daytime Entertainment
|
 Take This Lollipop
 The Ellen DeGeneres Show
 The Clarence Update - The Bold and the Beautiful
 The Today Show
|-
!scope="row" style="width=50%"|Outstanding Talk Show Entertainment
|
 Live! with Regis and Kelly
 The Ellen DeGeneres Show
 The Talk
 The View
|-
!scope="row" style="width=50%"|Outstanding Talk Show Informative
|
 The Dr. Oz Show
 Anderson
 The Doctors
|-
!scope="row" style="width=50%"|Outstanding Lead Actor in a Drama Series
|
 Anthony Geary as Luke Spencer on General Hospital
 Maurice Benard as Sonny Corinthos on General Hospital
 John McCook as Eric Forrester on The Bold and the Beautiful
 Darnell Williams as Jesse Hubbard on All My Children
 Robert S. Woods as Bo Buchanan on One Life to Live
|-
!scope="row" style="width=50%"|Outstanding Lead Actress in a Drama Series
|
 Heather Tom as Katie Logan Spencer on The Bold and the Beautiful
 Crystal Chappell as Carly Manning on Days of Our Lives
 Debbi Morgan as Angie Hubbard on All My Children
 Erika Slezak as Victoria Lord on One Life to Live
 Laura Wright as Carly Corinthos Jacks on General Hospital
|-
!scope="row" style="width=50%"|Outstanding Supporting Actor in a Drama Series
|
 Jonathan Jackson as Lucky Spencer on General Hospital
 Bradford Anderson as Damian Spinelli on  General Hospital
 Matthew Ashford as Jack Deveraux on Days of Our Lives
 Sean Blakemore as Shawn Butler on General Hospital
 Jason Thompson as Patrick Drake on General Hospital
|-
!scope="row" style="width=50%"|Outstanding Supporting Actress in a Drama Series
|
 Nancy Lee Grahn as Alexis Davis on General Hospital
 Melissa Claire Egan as Annie Lavery on All My Children
 Genie Francis as Genevieve Atkinson on The Young and the Restless
 Elizabeth Hendrickson as Chloe Mitchell on The Young and the Restless
 Rebecca Herbst as Elizabeth Webber on General Hospital
|-
!scope="row" style="width=50%"|Outstanding Younger Actor in a Drama Series
|
 Chandler Massey as Will Horton on Days of Our Lives
 Eddie Alderson as Matthew Buchanan on One Life to Live
 Chad Duell as Michael Corinthos on General Hospital
 Nathan Parsons as Ethan Lovett on General Hospital
|-
!scope="row" style="width=50%"|Outstanding Younger Actress in a Drama Series
|
 Christel Khalil as Lily Winters on  The Young and the Restless
 Molly Burnett as Melanie Jonas on Days of Our Lives
 Shelley Hennig  as Stephanie Johnson on Days of Our Lives
 Jacqueline MacInnes Wood as Steffy Forrester on The Bold and the Beautiful
|-
!scope="row" style="width=50%"|Outstanding Game Show Host
|
 Todd Newton on Family Game Night
 Ben Bailey on Cash Cab
 Wayne Brady on Let's Make a Deal
 Meredith Vieira, Who Wants to Be a Millionaire
|-
!scope="row" style="width=50%"|Outstanding Lifestyle/Culinary Host
|
 Sandra Lee on Semi-Homemade Cooking
 Rick Bayless on Mexico One Plate at a Time
 Nate Berkus, The Nate Berkus Show
 Paula Deen, Paula's Best Dishes
 Giada De Laurentiis on Giada at Home
|-
!scope="row" style="width=50%"|Outstanding Performer in a Children's Series
|
 Kevin Clash as Elmo on Sesame Street
Dakota Goyo as Josh on R.L. Stine's The Haunting Hour The Series
 Leslie Carrara-Rudolph as Abby Cadaby on Sesame Street
Caroll Spinney as Big Bird on Sesame Street
|-
!scope="row" style="width=50%"|Outstanding Talk Show Host
|
 Regis Philbin and Kelly Ripa on Live! with Regis and Kelly' Anderson Cooper on Anderson Mehmet Oz on The Dr. Oz Show Rachael Ray on Rachael Ray Lisa Masterson, Jillian Michaels, Andrew P. Ordon, Jim Sears, Travis Lane Stork and Wendy Walsh on The Doctors|-
!scope="row" style="width=50%"|Outstanding Drama Series Directing Team
|
 General Hospital The Bold and the Beautiful One Life to Live The Young and the Restless|-
!scope="row" style="width=50%"|Outstanding Drama Series Writing Team
|
 Days of Our Lives All My Children General Hospital The Young and the Restless|}

Lifetime Achievement Award
 Bill Geddie

 In Memoriam 
Deidre Hall presented the filmed tribute to the TV artists and producers who died in 2011:
 Jack LaLanne
 Jeff Conaway
 Leonard B. Stern
 Sherwood Schwartz
 David Pressman
 Mary Fickett
 Patricia Breslin
 Sue Mengers
 Judy Lewis
 Nick Santino
 Jonathan Frid
 Dick Clark 
 Bob Stewart
 Lee Rich
 Jim Paratore
 Kathryn Joosten
 Ray Bradbury
 Richard Dawson
 Judy Freudberg

Special Tributes
 All My Children One Life to Live''

References

039
Daytime Emmy Awards
Emmy Awards